Charles N. Anderson (January 14, 1858 – June 8, 1939) was an Ontario physician and political figure. He represented Essex South in the Legislative Assembly of Ontario as a Conservative member from 1908 to 1914.

He was born in Stephen Township, Huron County, Canada West, the son of James Anderson, and attended school in Leamington. He taught school in Tilbury West Township for several years, went on to study medicine at Trinity College and set up practice in Comber. He served on the public school board there and also served as medical health officer for the town. In 1890, he married Libbie Smith. In 1903, Anderson returned to Leamington. He died at Windsor on June 8, 1939.

References

External links

Commemorative biographical record of the county of Essex, Ontario ... (1905)

1858 births
1939 deaths
19th-century Methodists
Canadian Methodists
Progressive Conservative Party of Ontario MPPs